Collops vittatus, the melyrid beetle, is a species of soft-winged flower beetle in the family Melyridae. It is found in North and Central America.

References

External links

 

Melyridae
Beetles described in 1823